Aston Villa played the  1931–32 English football season in the Football League First Division.  Billy Smith remained trophy-less going into his sixth season.

With a full programme of New Year fixtures across all four divisions, The Times highlighted in particular Aston Villa's clash with high-flying Newcastle United. Villa had recently beaten Newcastle 3–0.

Diary
31 August 1931: Aston Villa draw 1 - 1 away at Huddersfield in front of a crowd of 13,226.

First Division

Squad statistics

Appearances
Alec Talbot, 45 appearances
Tommy Smart, 39 appearances
Eric Houghton, 39 appearances
Pongo Waring, 38 appearances
Tommy Mort, 37 appearances
Jimmy Gibson, 37 appearances
Joe Tate, 35 appearances
Joe Beresford, 34 appearances
Jack Mandley, 33 appearances
Harry Morton, 31 appearances, conceded 50
Billy Walker, 31 appearances
George Brown, 17 appearances
Dai Astley, 15 appearances
Fred Biddleston, 14 appearances, conceded 22
Reg Chester, 13 appearances
Tommy Wood, 13 appearances
Danny Blair, 10 appearances
Teddy Bowen, 5 appearances
George Stephenson, 4 appearances
Billy Simpson, 2 appearances
Billy Kingdon, 2 appearances
Tommy Moore, 1 appearance

References

Aston Villa F.C. seasons
Aston Villa F.C. season